The Hmong bobtail dog (Vietnamese: Chó H'Mông Cộc đuôi), is an ancient medium size spitz dog breed and one of Vietnam's Four Great National Dogs (Vietnamese: tứ đại quốc khuyển). This dog was primarily used a hunter, herder and guard dog by the Hmong people in northern Vietnam and today they are also used as border police and military dogs. While not FCI recognized, the Hmong bobtail dog is recognized by the Vietnam Kennel Association.

History 
While much of the Hmong bobtail dog's history is speculative, they are thought to be descended from natural bobtails of southern China who accompanied the Hmong in their migration to Vietnam where they were crossed with native Vietnamese jackals. Hmong traditions and legends indicate that they originated near the Yellow River region of China. The Hmong people were subjected to persecution and genocide by the Qing dynasty in the eighteenth and nineteenth centuries, and many fled to the mountains of northern Vietnam.

Characteristics

Appearance 
Hmong bobtail dogs are square, muscular, medium sized dogs. Their double coat is short and hard, without any feathering.

Bobtail 
Hmong bobtail dogs are natural bobtails, no docking is performed.

Temperament 
Hmong bobtail dogs are highly intelligent dogs and are prized for their ability to guide their owners along complex routes through the mountains. While Hmong bobtail dogs are loyal and friendly with their owner, they are aloof towards strangers and protective of their territory.

Health 
Hmong bobtail dogs are renowned for their excellent health, resistance to disease and extreme temperature.  Their average lifespan is 15–20 years.

References 

Dog breeds originating in Asia
Animal breeds originating in Vietnam